Iwo Kaczmarski (born 16 April 2004) is a Polish professional footballer who plays as a midfielder for Italian Serie A club Empoli, on loan from Raków Częstochowa.

Club career
On 30 January 2022, Kaczmarski joined Empoli in Italy on loan with a conditional obligation to buy.

Career statistics

Club

Notes

Honours
Raków Częstochowa
Polish Cup: 2021–22

References 

2004 births
Living people
Polish footballers
Poland youth international footballers
Association football midfielders
Korona Kielce players
Raków Częstochowa players
Empoli F.C. players
Ekstraklasa players
I liga players
Polish expatriate footballers
Expatriate footballers in Italy
Polish expatriate sportspeople in Italy